St Cadou was an early Christian in Brittany in France, not be confused with St Cadoc. He was venerated as a saint after his death, with his cult centered on the Ile de Cadou.

Sources 
Strayner, Joseph R., ed. Dictionary of the Middle Ages (New York: Charles Scribner's Sons, 1983) p. 7.

Christian saints in unknown century
Medieval Breton saints
Year of birth unknown